Gumball may refer to:

A ball made of gum often dispensed from a gumball machine
 Gumball (band), an alternative rock band from the 1990s
 Gumball (video game), a 1983 video game by Broderbund
 Gumball 3000, an international car rally
 The Amazing World of Gumball, an animated television series on Cartoon Network
 Gumball Watterson, protagonist of the television series The Amazing World of Gumball
 The Gumball Rally, a 1976 film
 Fruit from an American sweetgum, tree

See also  
Gum (disambiguation)